San Francisco Sola is a town and municipality in Oaxaca in south-western Mexico. The municipality covers an area of 71.45 km2. 
It is part of the Sola de Vega District in the Sierra Sur Region.

As of 2005, the municipality had a total population of 1321.

References

Municipalities of Oaxaca